Belleville Avenue Congregational Church is a historic church at 151 Broadway in Newark, Essex County, New Jersey, United States.

It was built in 1874 and added to the National Register of Historic Places in 1986.

See also 
 National Register of Historic Places listings in Essex County, New Jersey

References

Churches in Newark, New Jersey
Churches on the National Register of Historic Places in New Jersey
Gothic Revival church buildings in New Jersey
Churches completed in 1874
19th-century Protestant churches
William Appleton Potter church buildings
National Register of Historic Places in Newark, New Jersey
New Jersey Register of Historic Places